I Will Fight No More Forever is a 1975 made-for-television Western film starring James Whitmore as General Oliver O. Howard and Ned Romero as Chief Joseph. It is a dramatization of Chief Joseph's resistance to the U.S. government's forcible removal of his Nez Perce Indian tribe to a reservation in Idaho.

Plot
Set in 1877, the story follows Chief Joseph of the Nez Perce tribe, who lived in the border area of Idaho and Oregon. As President Ulysses S. Grant permits white settlers to come to both territories, the native Nez Perce fight back and defy the order from Grant to leave their home ground. The U.S. Army, commanded by General Oliver Howard (a Civil War Veteran) is then sent out to push the tribe out, leading to war. The fight between whites (both soldiers and settlers) and tribe members increases, leading Joseph to try for an escape to Canada, but deep down he fears a long, costly fight with a tough enemy. As he says to one member of the tribe who killed a white man for another tribe member's murder on the eve of war, "You have had your revenge. Now the white man will have his".

Cast
 James Whitmore as General Oliver O. Howard
 Ned Romero as Chief Joseph
 Sam Elliott as Captain Wood
John Kauffman as Wahlitits
 Emilio Delgado as Ollokot
 Nick Ramus as Rainbow
 Linda Redfearn as Toma
 Frank Salsedo as White Bird
Vince St. Cyr as Chief Looking Glass
Delroy White as Colonel Gibbon
Lance Hool as Sergeant Giles
Charles Ynfante as Yellow Wolf

Awards and nominations
Jeb Rosebrook and Theodore Strauss were nominated for the Primetime Emmy Award for Outstanding Writing in a Special Program - Drama or Comedy - Original Teleplay. Robert K. Lambert received a nomination for the Primetime Emmy for Outstanding Achievement in Film Editing for Entertainment Programming for a Special.

See also
 List of American films of 1975

External links

1975 films
1975 Western (genre) films
1975 television films
American war drama films
American Indian Wars films
War films based on actual events
Films set in Idaho
Films set in Wyoming
Films set in Montana
Films directed by Richard T. Heffron
Films scored by Gerald Fried
1975 drama films
The Wolper Organization films
Films about Native Americans
American drama television films
1970s American films